is a 1993 beat 'em up arcade game developed and released by Capcom. It stars the Marvel Comics' antihero the Punisher (Frank Castle) and co-stars S.H.I.E.L.D. agent Nick Fury as the second player's character as they embark on a mission to kill the crime lord the Kingpin and bring down his organization. While following the same general formula as Capcom's previous beat 'em ups, the game has a range of usable weapons and a comics-style presentation.

The Punisher gained significant popularity in arcades and is widely regarded as one of the best titles in the beat 'em up genre as well as one of the best video game adaptations of comic books. A Mega Drive/Genesis port was developed by Sculptured Software and published by Capcom to mixed reviews and commercial failure.

Gameplay

The Punisher follows the same side-scrolling beat'em up formula Capcom established in Final Fight (1989) and Captain Commando (1991) as the protagonists engage ordinary foes and stage bosses. As in most beat'em up games of this kind, progression through the game is achieved by systematically dispatching all varieties of henchmen to proceed onward to either right or left, and defeating the ringleaders whom the player(s) encounter at the boss stage of each level. Much like the limited roster of playable characters in Street Fighter (1987), the size, abilities and tactics of both player characters (the Punisher and Nick Fury) are essentially interchangeable; they both use the same basic moves, such as punches, kicks and throws, which can be chained into combos, as well as similar special attacks. Basic attacks can be combined to cause extra damage to enemies. The game is presented in a comic book-like style, including featuring on-screen onomatopoeias such as "BLAM!" for gunshots.

Various melee (including baseball bats and Japanese swords) and thrown weapons (including knives and shuriken) as well as improvised weapons (such as lead pipes, car tires and a crude flamethrower) can be picked up during regular combat. Weapons can be dropped by killed enemies or obtained from smashing various containers throughout the stages. When the player is armed with a weapon, its durability will be displayed alongside the player's health, showing how much it can be used until it breaks apart. Treasure can also be found in containers, awarding the player with bonus score points once collected (jewelry also appears after defeating female enemies). Health can be replenished by picking up food, which can also give bonus points. The game distinguished itself by the relatively high level of violence in a video game of the era, as well by the frequent use of firearms, including an Ingram and an M16. There are several sections of the game when gun-wielding enemies appear to which the characters draw their handguns, enabling the player to shoot them. Player characters can also pick up and collect hand grenades that can be deployed at a moment of choice.

Plot
In the game's intro, U.S. Marine Captain Frank Castle enjoys a picnic with his family in Central Park. The Castle family accidentally discovered a mob killing. Fearing any witnesses, the killers gunned down the family. To avenge them and all others like them Frank becomes The Punisher. The game begins in an illegal casino and the streets of the New York City, with the merciless vigilante Frank "the Punisher" Castle (optionally partnered with S.H.I.E.L.D. agent Nick Fury) in pursuit of the Mafia enforcer Bruno Costa who ordered the killing of Castle's family; the chase ends with a fight against Chester Scully (a minor villain from the comics). Frank "interrogates" Scully, gets the information he needs, and then promptly shoots him. Still on track of Bruno, the Punisher infiltrates the mob's Pantaberde resort in Florida via a water duct. He breaks into a hotel and corners Bruno, who is suddenly killed by a robot called Guardroid, who tells Frank the Kingpin has programmed him to terminate him, which the Punisher must then take on.

The Punisher then raids a major drug-smuggling ring at the local harbor, which ends with him confronting Bonebreaker in a waterfront warehouse. After that, the Punisher attacks the Kingpin's poppy field at a cave in Arizona. The Punisher boards and destroys a freight train which is commanded by Bushwhacker.

At that point, the Kingpin decides that he has lost enough henchmen and money to the Punisher's actions. He puts a hefty contract out on him, and he is chased by assassins from his hideout and through a forest. After defeating another Guardroid, the Punisher in turn assaults the King Building skyscraper. He fights his way through Jigsaw and other enemies to the final showdown against the Kingpin himself. After the Kingpin is defeated, the entire tower collapses, but the Kingpin is not found among the many dead criminals in the rubble.

Development and release

Arcade
The Punisher for the arcades was released in April 1993, marking the beginning of the partnership between Marvel Comics and Capcom, which led to the series Marvel vs. Capcom. The game used a new arcade system, allowing over 10 enemies to appear on screen at the same time without slowdowns. A pre-release version included some cut content such as rocket launchers. A version for the Capcom Power System Changer was planned and previewed but never released. Artworks from the game were featured in the 2012 art book Marvel vs. Capcom: Official Complete Works by Udon Entertainment. In 2019, the game was announced as one of the titles to be included in the Marvel Arcade1Up arcade cabinet.

Genesis
A console port of The Punisher was released for the Genesis in North America in 1994 and for the PAL region Mega Drive in April 1995. This version, while still published by Capcom, was developed by the independent American company Sculptured Software. In addition to the worse graphics and sound, lesser variety of enemies, and a smaller number of objects on screen than in the original, many of the previously breakable background objects were rendered unbreakable due to the limitations of the Genesis' hardware.

This version also contains some content censorship, including removing the most explicit violence as well as the animation of Fury smoking his cigar, and female ninja enemies with skimpy outfits becoming fully clothed. The port also comes with three difficulty settings, but the Easy setting ends after only three stages and the game can be properly completed only on Normal or Hard. A PlayStation version was reported in works by Crystal Dynamics, but was never completed.

Reception

Arcade
Upon its release, Play Meter listed The Punisher as one of the most popular arcade games at the time. Game Machine also listed it on their July 1, 1993 issue as being the eight most-popular arcade game at the time. GamePower gave the arcade version of The Punisher a perfect partial score for the game's "fun factor". Its action was praised by GamePro, who remarked that "this game's outstanding feature is its gorgeous graphics, which capture the dark, somber mood of the Punisher comic books". GameFan reviewer wrote The Punisher "proved to be everything I dreamed of in a traditional Final Fight-style game", having previously described it as "definitely the greatest side scrolling fighting game ever" as well as "the bloodiest, goriest fighting game since Mortal Kombat" in his preview.

Genesis
Reviewing the Genesis conversion, VideoGames called it "a decent exercise in vigilante mayhem" that is "surprisingly fun, yet fairly standard game". A preview by Mean Machines Sega opined it "looks good" and features "fantastic weaponry", but EGM criticized the characters for being too small on the screen, also stating that there was little to no skill involved in defeating the bosses. EGM praised the number of weapons and moves available but nonetheless concluded that "the whole game comes across as routine and bland". Mega Play reviewers especially criticized the port's removal of gore and the "drab" and "dull" color palette, issuing it four scores of between 67 and 72%.

GamePro outright panned the port, commenting that the special moves are too difficult to pull off, the sound effects are weak, the gameplay is generic and unimaginative beat 'em up fare, and "the graphics never come close to the coin-op game that this cart is based on". It was also lambasted by Next Generation, who stated that "not much good can be found" in the game and "the person responsible for putting out The Punisher deserves a good spanking". Hyper even had The Punisher as the worst rated game of the month, describing it as "almost like an 8 bit game: scrappy graphics, stilted animation, sloooowww scrolling and only two (yes, two) buttons on the controller used". The game sold poorly, resulting in it becoming one the rarest PAL region titles for the platform.

Retrospective
Notwithstanding the flawed home port and limited commercial success, the arcade original has achieved a cult game status. Sega Saturn Magazine and Official U.S. PlayStation Magazine both wished for The Punisher to be included in Capcom's arcade compilation releases for the Sega Saturn and the PlayStation, respectively. According to GamesTM in 2005, "Capcom's The Punisher was a brutally violent fighter that perfectly captured the antihero it was based on. Featuring buckets of blood, some nasty moves and hordes of enemies, action came thick and fast, and so did the excitement". The magazine too expressed a wish for it to be included in a compilation re-release for a more modern gaming system, in this case the PlayStation Portable, but noted that the chances of this are slim due to a long-expired license.

Retro Gamer called it "a forgotten gem in Capcom's back catalogue" that "is bursting with character and is extremely enjoyable", surmising the game did not sell well because the market was already flooded with beat 'em up games. Some media outlets also singled out for a special praise the game's particular elements, such as with Complex regarding its arcade cabinet and Cracked.com regarding its game over sequence. Crunchyroll's Patrick Macias wrote: "I'll confess my heart skipped a beat when I read The Punisher arcade game, the legacy of a misspent youth and countless tokens whittled away at Chuck E. Cheese".

Some critics regard The Punisher as among the best of the beat 'em up genre, as well as among the best video game adaptations of comic books, especially of Marvel titles. In 2010, it was ranked as the tenth top greatest superhero game by IGN's News & Features Team, and as the fifth top Marvel arcade game by iFanboys Josh Richardson. Nerdist Industries included it among the top ten most iconic Marvel video games in 2013, calling it "one of the few games that benefits from its cheesiness" and stating that in 1993 the two-player experience "was pretty much what Army of Two wishes it was today". That same year, it was also listed as one of top beat 'em up games of all time by Heavy.com's Elton Jones, as well as being included amongst the best looking beat 'em up games from the 16-bit era by Kotaku Australia's Gergo Vas. David Hawkins of WhatCulture! declared it number one best comics-based arcade game in a 2011 ranking, being "above and beyond all other arcade adaptations of comic books and their heroes", and Jon Ledford of Arcade Sushi opined that "in terms of pure enjoyment, ingenuity, control, and graphics, The Punisher is the Best Retro Beat 'Em Up of all time".

PlayStation Portable magazine Go Play reviewed the game alongside Willow and Cadillacs and Dinosaurs calling them "some of the best CPS1 games you're unlikely to ever play on a Capcom compilation".

References

External links

1993 video games
Arcade video games
Capcom beat 'em ups
Censored video games
Cancelled Capcom Power System Changer games
Cancelled PlayStation (console) games
Cooperative video games
CP System Dash games
Organized crime video games
Sega Genesis games
Side-scrolling beat 'em ups
Video games based on Punisher
Video games developed in Japan
Video games set in the 20th century
Video games set in Arizona
Video games set in Florida
Video games set in New York City
Video games scored by Yoko Shimomura
Multiplayer and single-player video games